Marquess of Villanueva de Valdueza, commonly known as Marquess of Valdueza is a hereditary title in the Peerage of Spain granted in 1624 by Philip IV to Fadrique Álvarez de Toledo, an important General of the Spanish Navy who prevented the Dutch conquest of Colonial Brazil. He was son of the 5th Marquess of Villafranca, who was in turn a great-grandchild of Pedro Álvarez de Toledo, 1st viceroy of Naples.

The title gave birth to the eponymous award-winning brand "Marqués de Valdueza", a high-end producer of olive oil, red wine, honey and vinegar managed by the current Marquesses of Valdueza and sold all over the world. Their products are elaborated in the 1,000 acre finca "Perales de Valdueza", one of the two family estates in Mérida, the other being "Azagala", of 17,000 acres in Badajoz, serving mainly as a hunting reserve. It has been praised as "one of the greatest olive oils" by the Financial Times, Vogue, Tatler, Fortnum & Mason, The Guardian and several other institutions.

The Álvarez de Toledo's have been one of the most prominent families in the history of the world, having held more than 80 titles in the peerage of Spain, including the dukedoms of Medina Sidonia, Alba and Infantado. They have produced 2 prime ministers of Spain, colonial governors, distinguished military officers, ecclesiastical figures and even a monarch of Tuscany.

Marquesses of Villanueva de Valdueza (1624)

 Fadrique Álvarez de Toledo y Mendoza, 1st Marquess of Valdueza (1580-1634)
 Fadrique Álvarez de Toledo y Ponce de León, 2nd Marquess of Valdueza (1635-1705), eldest son of the 1st Marquess
 José Fadrique Álvarez de Toledo y Córdoba, 3rd Marquess of Valdueza (1658-1728), eldest son of the 2nd Marquess
 Fadrique Vicente Álvarez de Toledo y Moncada, 4th Marquess of Valdueza (1686-1753), eldest son of the 3rd Marquess
 Antonio Álvarez de Toledo y Pérez de Guzmán, 5th Marquess of Valdueza (1716-1773), eldest son of the 4th Marquess
 José Álvarez de Toledo y Gonzaga, 6th Marquess of Valdueza (1756-1796), eldest son of the 5th Marquess
 Francisco de Borja Álvarez de Toledo y Gonzaga, 7th Marquess of Valdueza (1763-1821), second son of the 5th Marquess
 Pedro Álcantara Alvarez de Toledo y Palafox, 8th Marquess of Valdueza (1803-1867), second son of the 7th Marquess
 Pedro Álvarez de Toledo y Silva, 9th Marquess of Valdueza (1841-1898), third son of the 8th Marquess
 Alonso Álvarez de Toledo y Samaniego, 10th Marquess of Valdueza (1870-1936), third son of Alonso Tomás Álvarez de Toledo y Silva, second son of the 8th Marquess
 Alonso Álvarez de Toledo y Cabeza de Vaca, 11th Marquess of Valdueza (1903-1987), second son of the 10th Marquess
 Alonso Álvarez de Toledo y Urquijo, 12th Marquess of Valdueza (b. 1939), eldest son of the 11th Marquess

The heir apparent to the dukedom is Sonsoles Álvarez de Toledo y Argüelles (b. 1965), eldest daughter of the 12th Marquess.

See also
List of current Grandees of Spain

References

Grandees of Spain
Marquesses of Spain
Lists of Spanish nobility
Noble titles created in 1624